Club Voleibol Xàtiva is a Spanish volleyball club from Xàtiva. Founded in 1976, it is best known for its women's team, which was one of the leading Spanish teams in the second half of the 1980s under the sponsorship name of CV Tormo Barberá, winning three national championships and three national cups between 1986 and 1990 including a double and representing Spain in the European Cup. However, it was withdrawn from the competition in 1991 after its internationals were requested for a year by the national federation to prepare the 1992 Summer Olympics and its sponsor lost interest in the project. It has since played at a much more modest level in the lower regional categories.

Titles
Spanish League (3)
 1986, 1987, 1990
Spanish Cup (3)
 1987, 1988, 1989

References

Volleyball clubs established in 1976
Spanish volleyball clubs
Sports teams in the Valencian Community
Xàtiva